Roberto Ioan Diniță (born 10 March 2002) is a Romanian professional footballer who plays as a defensive midfielder.

Club career

Dinamo București

He made his Liga I debut for Dinamo București against FC U Craiova 1948 on 26 July 2021.

Personal life
Roberto Diniță is the son of football manager and former football player Laurențiu Diniță.

Career statistics

Club

References

External links
 
 

2002 births
Living people
Footballers from Bucharest
Romanian footballers
Association football midfielders
FC Dinamo București players
Liga I players
Romania youth international footballers